This is a glossary of acronyms and initials used for miscellaneous items, materials and nicknames in the Russian Federation and formerly the USSR. The Latin-alphabet names are phonetic representations of the Cyrillic originals, and variations are inevitable.

Miscellaneous

 Koktebel, Ukraine

 Koktebel, Ukraine

 Azotnaya Kislota – nitric acid

 Aviatsionnoye Mahslo Ghidravlicheskoye – hydraulic fluid

 Aviatsionnyye Pravila – aviation regulations

 Enamel [surface finish]

 Bombardirovshchik Dal'nevo Deystviya – bomber long range specification

 unmanned air vehicles

 Towed escort fighter research programme

 [stend] Bombovovo Vo'oroozheniya – bomb-loading test stand Myasischev Izdeliye M test stand.

 Soyuz Sovetskikh Sotsialisticheskikh Respublik – USSR union of soviet socialist republics

 understudy (second prototype)

  refuelling

 aircraft ramp launcher for SM-30

 export

 pre-production

 with afterburning

 state acceptance tests

 Izmeritel'nyy Kompleks Aerogheograficheskoy Razvedki – aerogeographical prospecting measurement suite

 altered

 catapult launched

 Komsomol'sko-Molodyozhnyy Ekipazh – Komsomol youth crew

 communist

 wings (aviation technical clubs

 first edition wings (for MiG-23)

 Kommandno-Shtabnoy Modool – command and headquarters module

 Klimovskiy Vektor Tyaghi – Klimov's vectored thrust

 flying legends airshow – Monino

 Lyohkiy Frontovoy Istrebitel – light tactical fighter requirement

 Lyohkiy Samolyot-Shtoormovik – light attack aircraft) requirement

 Mnogofunktsion-al'nyy Istrebitel – multifunctional fighter requirement

 Maghistrahl'niy Samolyot Dvadtsat' Pervogo Veka – airliner of the 21st century short haul airliner family/projects

 muscle-power-driven aircraft

 Mesnye Vozdooshnyye Linii – civilian air routes

  Moscow

 Naoochno-Tekhnicheskoye Tvorchestvo Molodyozhi – Scientific and Technical Achievements of Young Specialists Science fair

 Obshchiye Taktiko-Teknicheskiye Trebovaniya – general operational requirement military specification

  (Russian: Перспективный авиационный комплекс дальней авиации, Perspektivnyi Aviatsionnyi Kompleks Dalney Aviatsyi - Future Air Complex for Strategic Air Forces)

  (Russian: Перспективный авиационный комплекс фронтовой авиации, Perspektivny aviatsionny kompleks frontovoy aviatsii - Future Frontline Aircraft System for Frontal Aviation), 5th generation fighter programme Su-57

 Perspektivnyy Frontovoy Istrebitel'  – advanced tactical fighter GOR general operational requirement

 Perspektivnyy Lyohkiy Massovyy Istrebitel'  – advanced mass-produced light fighter GOR general operational requirement became LFI

 Perekhvahtchik s Treugol'nym [Krylom] – delta-wing interceptor In-house sukhoi project prefix

 Pooskovoye Oostroystvo  [dlya SM] tridtsat – ramp launcher [for Izdeliye SM-30]

 cannon

 step arrangement

 Raketa-Nositel' Samolyotnaya – air-launched space launch vehicle MiG-31

 Russian Knights Aerobatic Team

 (prefix) Strelovidnoye [krylo] – swept/arrow wings Sukhoi Project prefix

 main passenger cabin

 boundary layer blowing/control

 classified

 northern plant/factory

 Sistema Obyektivnovo Kontrolya Oochebno-Boyevykh Deystviy – combat training objective assessment system test equipment fot MiG-31

 dual controls

 special external stores (externally carried nuclear weapons)

 special slung load (nuclear)

 Sverkhzvookovoy Passazheerskiy Samolyot Pervovo Pokoleniya – first-generation supersonic airliner

 Stend Morornyy – engine test rig section of Izdeliye M wing and fuselage with two engines and representative fuel system for ground running and fuel system tests.

 swept wings

 Stalinskoye Zadanye – Stalins assignment

 (prefix) Treugol'noye [Krylo] – delta wings Sukhoi projects prefix

 Toplivo Ghipergolicheskoye – hypergolic fuel (self igniting)

 Taktiko-Teknicheskiye Trebovaniya – tactical/technical requirements military specification

 Weapons Heating

 Ooniversahl'nyy Aviatsionnyy Konteyner – cargo container

 Oochebnotrenirovochnyy Samolyot – conversion/proficiency trainer requirement

  guidance

 movable armament

 Pogroozochnokozlovoye Oostroystvo – cargo handling gantry crane

 low altitude Val'ozhka was sudden wing drop due to asymmetric torsional stiffness of the wings, high altitude Val'ozhka was caused by aerodynamic asymmetry (called Phantom Diver in RAF – un-commanded wing drop at high speeds

 Vystavka Dostizheniy Narodnovo Khozlaystva – national economy achievements exhibition

 Vremennyye Normy Lyotnoy Godnosti Sverkhzvookovykh Samolyotov – airworthiness regulations for supersonic aircraft

 manufacturers development tests

 Banner of Labour

 Star Town

Materials

 Aviatsionnaya Bronya – aviation armour Nickel/Molybdenum/Steel alloy

 Aluminium alloy

 Aluminium alloy

 Aluminiy Liteynyy – Aluminium Alloy [optimised for casting]

 Duralumin [Aluminium Alloy]

 Duralumin [Aluminium Alloy]

 Birch veneers, impregnated with phenolic resin, layered in a mould and formed under pressure at 150degC

 stainless steel

 Nickel/Chrome/steel alloys

 Chromium/Molybdenum/steel alloys

 Chromium/Manganese/Silicon/steel alloys

 mild steel

 Magnesium alloy

 Magnesium alloy

 Magnesium alloy

 mild steel

 Titanium alloy

 Birch veneers layered and glued over a mould using casein or albumen glues

 Aluminium alloy forgings

 Aluminium alloy)

 V high-strength Titanium alloy

Nicknames
These nicknames are used for aircraft, and/or aircraft equipment, either officially in the case of avionics or unofficially for other equipment.

 Stork

 Shark

 Diamond

 Amethyst

 Analogue

 Argon

 Harlequin

 Atlas

 Azalea

 Picture frame

 Butterfly

 Cormorant

 Barrier

 Barometer

 Snow Leopard

 Barium

 Base

 Shore

 Birch Tree

 Turquoise

 Bison

 Flea

 Bouquet

 Bunker

 Storm

 Damask steel

 "Бура́н" meaning "Snowstorm" or "Blizzard"

 [Pinocchio]

 Seagull

 Suitcase

 Black Sea

 baby Douglas

 Road

 Friendship

 Oak

 Woodpecker

 Girls Machine (Grigorovich E-2 (DG-55)

 Ether

 Screen

 Screen Wing

 Emblem

 Eucalyptus

 Phantasmagoria

 String Bean

 Horned Owl

 Flute

 Background

 Frigate Bird?

 Frigate

 Loon

 Gardenia

 Food store/Pantry

 Helium

 Geranium

 Globe

 Tadpole

 Hunchback

 Horizon

 Hail

 Rook

 Thunderstorm

 (Azerbaijani) Sun

 Needle

 Elm

 [river]

 Initiative

 Fig

 Spark

 Golden Oriole

 Emerald

 Great Auk

 Calibrator

 Drop of liquid

 retribution

 Crucian

 Cascade

 "Катюша" meaning 'little Katy'

 Cedar

 motion

 Cold

 Chrysanthemum

 Chrome

 Nickel-Chromium

 Square

 Dagger

 Maple

 Maple

 Cobalt

 Mosquito

 Comet

 Commune Worker

 Cone

 Cube

 Cupola

 Heading

 Spear

 Coral

 Kite (bird

 Red Cross

 Red October

 Gerfalcon

 Silicon

 Crystal

 Corn

 [slang] Corn-Duster

 Courier

 Quantum

 Square

 Receipt (colloquial – Kvitahntsiya

 Lily of the Valley

 Swallow

 Latvian Rifleman

 Azure/Prussian Blue

 Ice Smasher

 Lyre

 flying tube

 Liana Creeper

 Limousine

 Lithium

 Lotus

 Beam

 Lunar

 Buttercup

 Magnesium

 poppy

 Macaque (monkey

 Flywheel

 Little one / baby

 Mongoose

 Manoeuver

 Route

 Continent

 Beacon

 Sword

 Mercury

 Snowstorm

 Meteor

 Meteorite

 micron

 Almond

 world

 Lightning

 sea dragon

 Moscow

 Mosquito

 Juniper

 Neon

 Thread

 Knives trim tabs

 Little Light

 a Russian river

 Ocean

 Alder

 Experience / experiment

 Eagle

 Eagle

 Wasp

 Panther

 Password

 Sail

 Bearing

 Pelican

 Perseus

 Peony

 Pioneer*Pchel – Bee

 Pioneers Truth

 Flame

 Toadstool

 Weather

 Flight

 Stream

 Prairie

 Tributary

 Drive

 Prism

 person who lives by the sea

 Expanse

 Searchlight

 Bee

 Little Bee

 Puma

 Path/Way

 the Fifty

 Quantum

 a contraction of Rahdiodal'nomer (radio rangefinder

 Radical

 Rainbow

 Speech

 Planing Step

 Terrain

 Mignonette

 compass point

 Motherland

 Rhombus

 Ruby

 Ruslan (Russian legendary warrior)

 Russia

 sabre

 Sapphire

 Gem (old Russian

 Lilac

 (meaning not known – used for airborne delivered mine

 Sphere

 Ball/Balloon

 six-winged Seraph

 Squall

 Ramrod

 Spire

 Bayonet

 Rod

 Scalpel

 Siberian Inhabitant

 Siren

 Scythian

 Starling

 Tornado/Whirlwind

 Sable

 Falcon

 Hill

 break-off/mis-carry/abort

 Union

 twin/coupled/tandem probably derived from Sparennoye Oopravleniye – dual controls

 Rescue Worker

 Spectrum

 Standard

 Arrow

 String

 Vault/dome

 Pill/Tablet

 Typhoon

 Pitch [angle]

 Ramming attack

 Tiger

 Yopaz

 Ice Hummock

 Accuracy

 Tone

 Thorium

 Trapeze

 Route

 Tropic

 (Ukrainian)Rose

 number

 Cyclone

 Hurricane

 Duck

 Ukraine (Ukrainian?)

 Dill

 Duckling

 Knot

 Blizzard

 Fan

 fly anywhere aircraft/omniflyer

 Vortex

 Turn

 Cherry

 Life(Ukrainian?

 Sunrise

 East

 Air

 Aerial Ford Yakovlev AIR-5 with cabin

 Rendezvous

 Elm

 Altitude

 Anchor

 Amber

 Unicorn

 Jupiter

 Kernel

 Fir

 Coral

 Glow

 Dawn

 Shield/barrier

 Zebra

 Beetle

 Crane [bird]

 Winter

 Golden Eagle

 Banner of Labour

 Star

References

Gordon, Yefim. Early Soviet Jet Bombers. Hinkley, Midland. 2004. 
Gordon, Yefim. Early Soviet Jet Fighters. Hinkley, Midland. 2002. 
Gordon, Yefim. Sukhoi Interceptors. Hinkley, Midland. 2004. 
Gordon, Yefim. Soviet Rocket Fighters. Hinkley, Midland. 2006.  / 
Gordon, Yefim. Soviet Heavy Interceptors. Hinkley, Midland. 2004. 
Gordon, Yefim. Lavochkin's Last Jets. Hinkley, Midland. 2004.  / 
Gordon, Yefim & Komissarov, Dmitry & Komissarov, Sergey. OKB Ilyushin. Hinkley, Midland. 2004. 
Gunston, Bill. The Osprey Encyclopaedia of Russian Aircraft 1875–1995. London, Osprey. 1995. 
Antonov, Vladimir & Gordon, Yefim & others. OKB Sukhoi. Leicester. Midland. 1996. 
Gordon, Yefim. Komissarov, Dmitry & Sergey. OKB Yakovlev. Hinkley. Midland. 2005. 
Gordon, Yefim & Komissarov, Dmitry. OKB Mikoyan. Hinkley, Midland. 2009. 
Gordon, Yefim. Komissarov, Dmitry & Sergey. OKB Ilyushin. Hinkley. Midland. 2004. 
Gordon, Yefim & Rigmant, Vladimir. Tupolev Tu-144. Midland. Hinkley. 2005.  
Gordon, Yefim & Komissarov, Dmitry. Antonov An-12. Midland. Hinkley. 2007.  
Gordon, Yefim & Komissarov, Dmitry & Komissarov, Sergey. Mil's Heavylift Helicopters. Hinkley, Midland. 2005. 
Gordon, Yefim. Tupolev Tu-160 "Blackjack". Hinkley, Midland. 2003. 
Gordon, Yefim & Komissarov, Dmitry. Antonov's Jet Twins. Hinkley, Midland. 2005. 
Gordon, Yefim & Komissarov, Dmitry. Kamov Ka-27/-32 Family. Hinkley, Midland. 2006.  
Gordon, Yefim & Komissarov, Dmitry. Antonov An-2. Midland. Hinkley. 2004. 
Gordon, Yefim & Rigmant, Vladimir. Tupolev Tu-114. Midland. Hinkley. 2007.  
Gordon, Yefim & Komissarov, Dmitry. Ilyushin Il-12 and Il-14. Midland. Hinkley. 2005.  
Gordon, Yefim. Yakovlev Yak-36, Yak-38 & Yak-41. Midland. Hinkley. 2008. 
Gordon, Yefim. Komissarov, Dmitry & Sergey. Antonov's Turboprop Twins. Hinkley. Midland. 2003. 
Gordon, Yefim. Myasischev M-4 and 3M. Hinkley. Midland. 2003. 
Gordon, Yefim & Rigmant, Vladimir. Tupolev Tu-104. Midland. Hinkley. 2007. 
Gordon, Yefim. Komissarov, Dmitry. Mil Mi-8/Mi-17. Hinkley. Midland. 2003. 
Gordon, Yefim & Dexter, Kieth Polikarpov's I-16 Fighter. Hinkley. Midland. 2001. 
Gordon, Yefim. Mikoyan MiG-25 "Foxbat". Hinkley. Midland. 2007.  
Gordon, Yefim & Dexter, Kieth Mikoyan's Piston-Engined Fighters. Hinkley. Midland. 2003. 
Gordon, Yefim & Rigmant, Vladimir. Tupolev Tu-4. Midland. Hinkley. 2002. 
Gordon, Yefim. Sukhoi S-37 and Mikoyan MFI. Midland. Hinkley. 2001 reprinted 2006.  
Gordon, Yefim. Khazanov, Dmitry. Yakovlev's Piston-Engined Fighters. Hinkley. Midland. 2002. 
Gordon, Yefim. Sal'nikov, Andrey. Zablotsky, Aleksandr. Beriev's Jet Flying Boats. Hinkley. Midland. 2006.  
Gordon, Yefim. & Dexter, Keith. Polikarpov's Biplane Fighters. Hinkley. Midland Publishing. 2002. 
Gordon, Yefim. Soviet/Russian Aircraft Weapons. Midland. 2004. 

Gordon, Yefim. Sukhoi S-37 and Mikoyan MFI''. Midland. Hinkley. 2001. 

Glossaries of Russian and USSR aviation
Wikipedia glossaries using description lists